Forward is the eighth studio album from Flame. Clear Sight Music released the project on July 17, 2015. The album charted on three Billboard magazine charts.

Critical reception

Awarding the album four stars from CCM Magazine, Matt Conner states, "Through it all, Flame addresses the global church with a potent cocktail of truth and chastisement, hope and love." The Christian Manifesto rating the album four stars, writes, "Forward is the lyrical version of those books on my shelves." James Fields, giving the album five stars at The Christian Beat, describes, "he has produced a high quality album with a timely message and great lyrical delivery using many rap styles."

Tracks

Charts

References

2015 albums
Flame (rapper) albums